Frederick Fraser may refer to:

Frederick Fraser (politician) (1895–1990), politician in the Yukon
Charles Frederick Fraser (1850–1925), Canadian educator
Frederic Charles Fraser (1880–1963), English entomologist